The eastern blue groper (Achoerodus viridis) is a species of wrasse native to southeastern Australia from Hervey Bay in southern Queensland to Wilsons Promontory in Victoria. Juveniles inhabit beds of seagrass in estuaries. The diet of this species consists of invertebrates such as various molluscs, crabs, sea urchins, and cunjevoi. In 1998, the eastern blue groper was made the state fish emblem of New South Wales.

Distribution and habitat
The eastern blue groper is native to the southeastern coast of Australia. Its range extends from Mooloolaba in southern Queensland southwards to Wilsons Promontory in the south of Victoria, including the eastern end of the Bass Strait.

Behaviour
The eastern blue groper feeds mainly on crabs, shrimps, molluscs and echinoderms. Juvenile fish live in seagrass beds, where their diet is primarily small crustaceans. This fish is a sequential hermaphrodite, starting life as a female and becoming a male when it has reached a length of at least . The fish become sexually mature at age two to three, and breeding takes place between July and September. The larvae are planktonic at first and settle in seagrass beds.

Status
It is a slow-growing, long-lived fish, and the generation turnover time is approximately twelve to fifteen years. At one time the population was dwindling because of excessive spearfishing, but in 1972, the New South Wales authorities put a ban in place, preventing all spearfishing and commercial fishing for this species. Its population size since then seems to have stabilised and the IUCN has listed it as being "Near Threatened".

References

viridis
Marine fish of Eastern Australia
Taxa named by Franz Steindachner
eastern blue groper